The Păpăuți is a left tributary of the river Covasna in Romania. It flows into the Covasna near Brateș.

References

Rivers of Romania
Rivers of Covasna County